Thierry Marichal (born 13 June 1973 in Leuze-en-Hainaut) is a Belgian former professional road bicycle racer.

Major results

 Duo Normand (2005-with Sylvain Chavanel)
 Bayern-Rundfahrt – 1 stage (2000)
 Circuit Franco-Belge – 1 stage (2000)
 Tour de l'Oise – 1 stage (1999)
 GP Fayt-le-Franc (1999)
 3rd, National Time Trial Championship (1999)
 Tour de Wallonie – Overall (1997)

External links 

1973 births
Living people
People from Leuze-en-Hainaut
Belgian male cyclists
Cyclists from Hainaut (province)